Mount Cairnes is a  mountain summit located in the Freshfield Ranges of the Canadian Rockies in British Columbia, Canada. The mountain was named in 1917 after noted geologist Delorme Donaldson Cairnes (1879-1917) of the Geological Survey of Canada from 1905 through 1917. The mountain's name was officially adopted March 31, 1924, when approved by the Geographical Names Board of Canada. There is also another Mount Cairnes named for this same person located in Yukon, where he did much of his work.

Climate

Based on the Köppen climate classification, Mount Cairnes is located in a subarctic climate with cold, snowy winters, and mild summers. Winter temperatures can drop below  with wind chill factors below . Precipitation runoff from the mountain drains into Blaeberry River which is a tributary of the Columbia River.

See also
 Geology of the Rocky Mountains
 List of mountains in the Canadian Rockies

References

External links
 Weather: Mount Cairnes

Three-thousanders of British Columbia
Canadian Rockies
Columbia Country
Kootenay Land District